Rodell is a surname. Notable people with the surname include:

Barbara Rodell (born 1945/1946), American actress
Fred Rodell (1907–1980), American law professor
Jeremiah J. Rodell (1921–2015), United States Air Force brigadier general
Scott M. Rodell, American martial artist, author, and teacher of Yang-style taijiquan